A Thousand Words is the sixth album for artist Styrofoam aka Arne Van Petegem. It is also the first for label Nettwerk.

A Thousand Words eschews previous methods of what Styrofoam calls “bedroom producing” in favor of a fresh approach. Breaking the mold from previous Styrofoam albums, which were self-produced, A Thousand Words enlisted the guidance of Wax Ltd (Wally Gagel and Xandy Barry), a Los Angeles production team with some pretty varied credits ranging from Sebadoh and Tanya Donelly to The Eels and Folk Implosion—and even the Backstreet Boys and Jessica Simpson. That experience with both indie rock and pop was something Van Petegem found very attractive.

The album features a diverse yet cohesive array of guest vocalists, like Jim Adkins from Jimmy Eat World, Blake Hazard and Josh Rouse. Van Petegem has grown out of the, as he puts it, “shy electronic guy afraid of singing” to return to his roots singing in indie rock bands. He sounds relaxed and joyful as he delivers bright, multi-layered harmonies and simple, thought-provoking lyrics.

"I basically wanted to make an uptempo pop album with big choruses to sing along to. I sort of figured I’d made enough sulky midtempo music for the rest of my life . . . I’m very interested in presenting all these weird sounds, bleeps etc. in a package that is quite accessible overall. But when you listen a little deeper, there is still a lot there to discover."

Track listing
"After Sunset" – 3:40
"A Thousand Words" – 3:42
"My Next Mistake" [Ft. Jim Adkins] – 4:41
"No Happy Endings" [Ft. Erica Driscoll] – 4:09
"Microscope" [Ft. Blake Hazard] – 3:55
"Thirty to One" – 4:38
"Other Side of Town" – 4:20
"Lil White Boy" [Ft. Josh Rouse] – 4:03
"No Deliveries List" [Ft. Lili De La Mora] – 4:22
"Bright Red Helmet" – 4:13
"Final Offer" – 3:09

Release history

Styrofoam (musician) albums
2008 albums